Sphyrna (from the Greek word σφῦρα, "hammer") is a genus of hammerhead sharks with a cosmopolitan distribution in the world's oceans. Members of Sphyrna have a tendency to inhabit coastal waters along the intertidal zone rather than the open ocean, as their prey such as invertebrates, fish, rays, small crustaceans, and other benthic organisms hide in the sands and sediment along these zones. Members of Sphyrna are also known by synonyms such as Zygaena, Cestracion, and Sphyrichthys. The earliest species described of this genus was Sphyrna zygaena by Carl Linnaeus in 1758, while the latest described member, Sphyrna gilberti, was discovered and described in 2013.

Species 
The recognized species in this genus are:

Extant
 Sphyrna corona (S. Springer, 1940) (scalloped bonnethead)
 Sphyrna gilberti Quattro, Driggers, Grady, Ulrich & M. A. Roberts, 2013 (Carolina hammerhead)
 Sphyrna lewini (E. Griffith & C. H. Smith, 1834) (scalloped hammerhead)
 Sphyrna media (S. Springer, 1940) (scoophead)
 Sphyrna mokarran (Rüppell, 1837) (great hammerhead)
 Sphyrna tiburo (Linnaeus, 1758) (bonnethead)
 Sphyrna tudes (Valenciennes, 1822) (smalleye hammerhead)
 Sphyrna zygaena (Linnaeus, 1758) (smooth hammerhead)

Extinct
 † Sphyrna arambourgi (Cappetta, 1970)
 † Sphyrna gibbesii (Hay, 1902)
 † Sphyrna integra (Probst, 1878)
 † Sphyrna laevissima (Cope, 1867)
 † Sphyrna magna (Cope, 1867)

References

External links 
 

 
Shark genera
Taxa named by Constantine Samuel Rafinesque